Phomopsis tanakae is a fungal plant pathogen infecting apples.

References

External links
 USDA ARS Fungal Database

Fungal tree pathogens and diseases
Apple tree diseases
tanakae